Meera Ke Girdhar is a 1993 Hindi-language devotional movie directed by Vijay Deep. It is about Hindu mythological story of Meera's love and devotion towards Lord Krishna.

Cast
Upasna Khosla
Virendra Mahthan
 Arun Bali
Himani Shivpuri
Renuka Israni
Parikshit Sahni

Soundtrack
All songs were composed by Kanak Raj and penned by Zaheer Anwar.

References

1993 films
1990s Hindi-language films
Films scored by Kanak Raj